Titovka is a rural locality (a railway station) in Pechengsky District of Murmansk Oblast, Russia, located beyond the Arctic Circle. As of the 2010 Census the locality has a population of 1.

History
It was founded in the 1860s—the decade when the Murman Coast was actively being settled. It is located at the former Koshka Yavr Airbase which is now closed down.

References

Notes

Sources

Rural localities in Murmansk Oblast
